Kemal Burkay (1937, Kizilkale, Mazgirt, Tunceli) is a writer and politician.

Biography 
He attended his primary education in Tunceli and graduated from Ankara University, Law School in 1960.

Political career 
In 1965 he joined the Türkiye İşçi Partisi. Due to an article published in 1966, he was jailed in prison. Following the coup d'état in 1971 most of the Kurds who were politically involved were detained. Burkay was imprisoned for one year, and after a new arrest warrant surged, Burkay went into exile to Germany in 1972. In 1974, Burkay was involved prominently in the establishment of the Socialist Party of Kurdistan (TKPS) which published the magazine Özgürlük Yolu between 1975 to 1979. Özgürlük Yolu was to become an influential magazine for the Kurdish politicians at the time. In 1980, just ahead of the coup d' etat of the military, he left Turkey and settled in Sweden. In 1993, then the head of the Socialist Party of Kurdistan, he was interviewed for 18 days together with Abdullah Öcalan by the journalist Oral Çalışlar. The interview was then published in the Cumhuryet and later in booklet, which caused quite some controversies in Turkish politics as the publication of the booklet was banned. Burkay supported the ceasefire announced by the Kurdistan Workers' Party (PKK) on 17 March 1993. He signed an agreement for future cooperation with Öcalan on the 19 March 1993. In 2011, he returned from his exile in Sweden after the government of the Justice and Development Party (AKP) improved the situation for the Kurdish movement and in 2012 he was elected as the president of HAK-PAR, a party which advocates for the improvement of the situation of the Kurdish population in Turkey.

Personal life 
He is married and father to 5 children.

References 

Turkish Kurdish politicians
Living people
1937 births
People from Mazgirt
Kurdish writers
Ankara University Faculty of Law alumni
Exiled politicians